Played in Space: The Best of Something Corporate is a compilation album by Something Corporate released April 27, 2010. It is made up of two discs: one, a greatest hits album, and the other with previously unreleased tracks and newly mixed songs. An exclusive iTunes edition contains the bonus track "Letters to Noelle". The title "Played in Space" is a reference to the fact that NASA control on Earth played the song "The Astronaut" as a morning "wake-up call" to space shuttle astronauts in 2006. The compilation debuted at 155 on the Billboard 200.

Track listing

Disc One

Disc Two

References

2010 greatest hits albums
Something Corporate albums